Vladimir Mikhailovich Zeldin (10 February 1915 – 31 October 2016) was a Soviet and Russian stage and film actor. A centenarian, he was among the longest-serving stage performers and continued acting up until his death.

Early life
Zeldin was born in the town of Kozlov (now Michurinsk, Tambov Oblast of Russia), the youngest of five children. With the start of the Russian Civil War the family moved to their relatives in Tver. His mother Anna Nikolayevna Zeldina (née Popova, 1884–1931) was a native Russian teacher turned a housewife. His father Mikhail Yevgenyevich Zeldin (1876—1928) was a musician of Jewish origin who converted to Russian Orthodoxy in order to enter the Moscow Conservatory; he served as a kapellmeister in the Imperial Russian Army concert band and as the head of the Kozlov and Tver music schools after the October Revolution. Vladimir himself was raised in the Russian Orthodox traditions and associated himself with Russian culture.

In 1924 the family moved to Moscow. Zeldin continued studying at the secondary school. He also learned to play trumpet, piano and violin, and at the age of 12 tried to enter The Bolshoi Theatre Ballet School. According to Zeldin, his father wished him a better career and was highly against this decision, so he did everything to prevent his son from entering the school. For several years Vladimir played trumpet in the military band under the Joint State Political Directorate led by his father's friend Feodor Nikolaevsky. In 1935 he graduated from the theatre college at the Mossovet Theatre where he studied under Evgeny Lepkovsky and became its actor.

Career
In 1938 Zeldin moved to the Moscow Transport Theatre (modern-day Gogol Center) where he performed as Antipholus of Syracuse in The Comedy of Errors and Ferdinand in Intrigue and Love, among other roles.

Zeldin became an all-Union celebrity in 1941 starring in the leading role in the musical comedy They Met in Moscow by Ivan Pyryev. His other famous movie works include Boris Olenich in Ballad of Siberia (1947), Aldemaro in Dance Teacher (1952), a clown in Carnival Night (1956), Aleksandr Vladimirovich Serebryakov in Uncle Vanya (1970), Judge in Desyat Negrityat (1987) and grandfather in Cops and Robbers (1997), a remake of the Italian comedy of the same name.

During the Battle of Moscow he and other actors were evacuated to Almaty where he played in the Alma-Ata Russian Drama Theatre. He also visited the frontline to perform for soldiers and was awarded the Medal "For Valiant Labour in the Great Patriotic War 1941–1945" after the war.

From 1945 to his death Zeldin performed in the Russian Army Theatre. His most famous role was Aldemaro in The Dancing Master play by Lope de Vega. Other popular roles include Tranio in The Taming of the Shrew, Aleksandr Vladimirovich Serebryakov in Uncle Vanya, Albert Gregor in The Makropulos Affair, Frank Gardner in Mrs. Warren's Profession and others. The Most Honest, a satirical play about an elderly Baron Munchausen, was written by Grigori Gorin on Zeldin's suggestion and with him in mind. It was an enormous success and was later adapted by Mark Zakharov into a TV movie The Very Same Munchhausen with Oleg Yankovsky in the lead.

In February 2005 Zeldin celebrated his 90th birthday by performing in the new musical Man of La Mancha (which premiered in December 2004) where he starred both as Don Quixote and Miguel de Cervantes. The role of Don Quixote quickly became his signature role and he closely associated himself with the character.

He celebrated his 101st birthday on stage by performing the leading role in the play Dance with the Master (loosely based on The Dancing Master) and written specially for him. According to the director Yuli Gusman, a total of 200 performances of Man of La Mancha and Dance with the Master were staged during Zeldin's lifetime. Man of La Mancha was last shown just a month prior to the actor's death. Due to a recent hip fracture, he had to perform with a walking stick.

Later years
Zeldin was, as of 2014, the oldest living People's Artist of the USSR. He turned 101 in 2016.

In June 2005, his signature appeared under the open letter by "members of culture, science and public representatives" published in Izvestia where they supposedly expressed support to the court decision concerning the former Yukos management. However, a number of signatories, including Zeldin, denied their involvement.

In October 2013, at the age of 98 he took part in the 2014 Winter Olympics torch relay, becoming the oldest torchbearer in history for that time.

Vladimir Zeldin died on 31 October 2016 and was buried at the Novodevichy Cemetery in Moscow. He was survived by his third wife Ivetta Evgenievna Kapralova-Zeldina (1933—2017) who died just two months after her husband and was buried near him. They lived together for 52 years.

Vladimir Zeldin's only son (from his first civil wife Lyudmila Martynova) died of a gastric infection at the age of 18 months in 1941. Zeldin took care of his grave until his death.

Honours and awards
Order "For Merit to the Fatherland";
 1st class (20 January 2015)
 2nd class (10 February 2010) - for outstanding contribution to the development of theatrical art, and many years of creative activity
 3rd class (10 February 2005) - for outstanding contribution to the development of theatrical art, and many years of creative activity
 4th class (10 February 2000) - for outstanding contribution to the development of domestic theatrical art
 Order of Friendship (21 June 1995) - for services to the state, achievements in work and significant contribution to strengthening friendship and cooperation between peoples
 Order of the Red Banner of Labour, three times (1968, 1980, ?)
 People's Artist of the USSR (1975)
 People's Artist of the RSFSR (1959)
 Honored Artist of the RSFSR (1954)
 Gratitude "for outstanding creative achievement in musical theatre" National Festival "Musical Heart of Theatre" (2006)
 Prize of the Russian Federation in the field of culture (2008) - for the play "Man of La Mancha"
Stalin Prize, 2nd class (1951)
 Prize "for the honour and dignity" of the National Theatre Award Golden Mask (2010)
 Medal "In Commemoration of the 850th Anniversary of Moscow"
Medal "For Valiant Labour in the Great Patriotic War 1941–1945"
 Medal "Veteran of Labour"

Partial filmography

1938: The Oppenheim Family (Семья Оппенгейм) (TV Series) - (uncredited)
1941: They Met in Moscow (Свинарка и пастух) - Musaib Gatyev
1944: Ivan the Terrible (Иван Грозный) - assistant to the Livonian ambassador
1948: Ballad of Siberia (Сказание о земле Сибирской) - Boris Olenich
1952: Dance Teacher (Учитель танцев) - Aldemaro
1956: V kvadrate 45 - Boris Shmelyov diversant
1956: Carnival Night (Карнавальная ночь) - Nikolayev / Tip Clown
1961: Chronicle of Flaming Years (Повесть пламенных лет) - Yevgeniy Gribovskiy
1965: The Tsar's Bride - Bomely
1965: The Salvos of the Aurora Cruiser - poruchik Andronnikov
1967: Bereg nadezhdy - Vandenberg
1968: Neoknchennaya simfoniya - Kherbek
1970: Uncle Vanya (Дядя Ваня) - Professor Aleksandr V. Serebryakov
1971: Mission in Kabul - Major Stein
1974: With You and Without You - Yevstigney - Fyodor's Father
1974: Blokada: Luzhskiy rubezh, Pulkovskiy meredian - von Leeb
1975: Na kray sveta - otets Volodi
1976: We Didn't Learn This - kapitan I ranga
1976: Strakh vysoty - professor Vladimir Dyagilyev
1977: Polkovnik v otstavke - Ivan Mikhaylovich
1977: Tsentrovoy iz podnebesya
1977: Printsessa na goroshine
1977: Blokada: Leningradskiy metronom, Operatsiya Iskra - von Leeb
1978: 31 June (31 июня) (TV Movie) - Meliot, king of Peradore / Mr. Dimmock, chief advertising agency
1979: Dobryaki
1980: Rafferty (Рафферти) (TV Movie) - US Senator Fellows
1981: Zhenshchina v belom - Frederic Fairlie
1983: A Mistery of Blackbirds - police commissioner
1984: Victory (Победа) - James F. Byrnes
1985: Pobeda - Birns
1987: And Then There Were None (Десять негритят) - Judge Lawrence Wargrave
1988: Zapretnaya zona
1989: Kanuvshee vremya
1991: Iskushenye B (Искушение Б) - the Duke
1997: Dandelion Wine (Вино из одуванчиков) - Mr. Spaulding
1998: Cops and Robbers (Полицейские и воры) - grandfather
1998: Classic - Vasya Rezanyj
2000: Zhenshchin obizhat ne rekomenduetsya - Idkind
2006: Park Sovetskogo perioda
2006: Andersen. Life Without Love (Андерсен. Жизнь без любви) - night watchman
2007: Karnavalnaya noch 2, ili 50 let spustya - Old clown
2007: Chertovo koleso
2007: Happy Together (Счастливы вместе) (TV Series) - collector
2010-2011: Svaty (Сваты) (TV Series) - Nikolai Nikolaevich
2015: Ubezhat, dognat, vluybitsya - (final film role)

References

External links

 
 
 Vladimir Zeldin. Russian Don Quixote
 Vladimir Zeldin's page at the Russian Army Theatre website 

1915 births
2016 deaths
20th-century Russian male actors
21st-century Russian male actors
People from Michurinsk
Academicians of the Russian Academy of Cinema Arts and Sciences "Nika"
Honored Artists of the RSFSR
People's Artists of the RSFSR
People's Artists of the USSR
Stalin Prize winners
Full Cavaliers of the Order "For Merit to the Fatherland"
Recipients of the Nika Award
Recipients of the Order of the Red Banner of Labour
Recipients of the Order of the Red Star
Men centenarians
Russian centenarians
Russian male film actors
Russian male stage actors
Russian male television actors
Russian people of Jewish descent
Soviet male film actors
Soviet male stage actors
Soviet male television actors
Deaths from multiple organ failure
Burials at Novodevichy Cemetery